Eilema fasciata is a moth of the subfamily Arctiinae. It was described by Frederic Moore in 1878. It is found in Sri Lanka.

References

fasciata
Moths described in 1878
Insects of Sri Lanka